This is a list of VTV dramas released in 1997.

←1996 - 1997 - 1998→

VTV Tet dramas
These films were released on VTV channel during Tet holiday. In this time, all of the channels were merged with a single broadcast schedule.

Note: Since late 1996, Vietnam Television Audio Visual Center (Vietnamese: Trung tâm nghe nhìn - Đài truyền hình Việt Nam) had been converted to Vietnam Television Film Production (Vietnamese: Hãng phim truyền hình Việt Nam).

Vietnamese dramas on VTV1 night time slot
Following the schedule since late 1996, the Wednesday night (around 21:00) on VTV1 was spent to air Vietnamese films more often than the other time slots but it was unstable. It sometimes was used as an extension for foreign drama time slots. In some other cases, the broadcast schedule for several Vietnamese dramas was expanded to non-Wednesdays. The list below includes some of the films that did not air on Wednesdays.

Since 22 Aug, this function of Wednesday was reassigned to Friday.

Unstable time slot on Wednesday night

Ốc đảo vua & Hoàng Lê nhất thống
Since the last weekend of April, these two dramas was released on time slots made for their own.

Unstable time slot on Friday night

For The First Time On VTV3 Screen dramas
New program was created this year. For The First Time On VTV3 Screen (Vietnamese: Lần đầu tiên trên màn ảnh VTV3) introduced Vietnamese dramas that had not been aired on VTV3 before. The program was first launched on Tuesday late afternoon (2 Sep) in the occasion of the National Day but then moved to Wednesday late afternoon (around 17:30) since the next issue.

VTV3 Sunday Literature & Art dramas
These dramas air in early Sunday afternoon on VTV3 as a part of the program Sunday Literature & Art (Vietnamese: Văn nghệ Chủ Nhật).

Note: The time slot was delayed on 9 Feb due to the broadcast schedule for Tet programs.

See also
 List of dramas broadcast by Vietnam Television (VTV)
 List of dramas broadcast by Hanoi Radio Television (HanoiTV)
 List of dramas broadcast by Vietnam Digital Television (VTC)

References

External links
VTV.gov.vn – Official VTV Website 
VTV.vn – Official VTV Online Newspaper 

Vietnam Television original programming
1997 in Vietnamese television